Goodby, Silverstein & Partners (also known as GSP) is an advertising agency based in San Francisco.

History
The agency was founded on April 15, 1983 as Goodby, Berlin & Silverstein by Jeff Goodby, Andy Berlin and Rich Silverstein. Andy Berlin left in 1992 and the agency was renamed. Goodby, Silverstein & Partners is now part of the Omnicom Group, Inc., an advertising holding company. The agency is based in San Francisco, CA. In 2015, after 32 years, Rich Silverstein and Jeff Goodby announced they were passing on the reigns of the creative department to Margaret Johnson, Executive Creative Director and Eric Kallman, Executive Creative Director. Margaret and Eric were also named to Adweek's Creative 100 list in 2015. Derek Robson has been the President and Managing Partner since 2005.

The firm supported the California Milk Processors Board and GSP initiated the Got Milk? campaign in 1993. For Elizabeth Arden, GSP created Britney's fantasy reality to promote her Curious fragrance.

As an offshoot of the popular Budweiser Frogs campaign, GSP introduced the Budweiser Lizards, Frank and Louie, during the 1998 Super Bowl with the spot entitled, "Bad Day to be a Frog," in which the frogs were electrocuted by the jealous lizards.

Inspired by the famous Budweiser Clydesdales, the "Born a Donkey" commercial came from the perspective of a donkey who always wanted to be a Clydesdale. The spot was nominated in the Outstanding Commercial category for the 2004 Creative Arts Emmys.

The agency has been nominated for a total of four Emmy's in the Outstanding Commercial category. In addition to "Born a Donkey" they received nominations for Saturn's "Door Music" in 2004, for Sprint/Nextel's "Wedding" in 2009, and for Adobe's "Dream On" in 2015.

In 2006, Anheuser-Busch purchased the Rolling Rock brand. Rolling Rock loyalists began to boycott the beer. GSP was tasked to resurrect the brand back to life. Feeding into the bad press, GSP created a fictional VP of Marketing for Rolling Rock, Ron Stablehorn, who promoted all the wrong things, including a "Beer Ape" that parachuted into beer-less parties.

During the 2010 Super Bowl, GSP premiered the promotion for everyone in America to receive a free grand slam on February 9, 2010. Denny's ended up serving 2 million free Grand Slams as a result.

In 2014-2015, the agency received several awards for their work including a bronze lion at Cannes for Comcast/XFINITY "Emily's Oz" and a gold and two silver lions for Adobe's "Dream On".

In 2015, the firm released a series of Trojan PSAs featuring rapper and comedian Lil Dicky, who had been previously employed by the company.

References

External links
 
 Goodby Silverstein & Partners creative work and company info

Advertising agencies of the United States
Marketing companies established in 1983
Companies based in San Francisco
1983 establishments in California